Collins Township may refer to one of the following places within the United States:

 Collins Township, Story County, Iowa
 Collins Township, McLeod County, Minnesota
 Collins Township, St. Clair County, Missouri
 Collins Township, Buffalo County, Nebraska
 Collins Township, Allegheny County, Pennsylvania, a former township now part of Pittsburgh

Township name disambiguation pages